Roald Amundsen High School is a public 4–year high school located between the Ravenswood, Andersonville and Lincoln Square neighborhoods in Chicago, Illinois, United States. Opened in 1929, Amundsen is a part of Chicago Public Schools district. The school is named for Norwegian explorer Roald Engelbregt Gravning Amundsen (1872–1928). In 2015, the school achieved "Level 1 Status in Good Standing" under the district's performance policy rating. The school shares a part of its campus with another Chicago public school, Eliza Chappell Elementary School.

History
The school was named after Roald Amundsen, the Norwegian explorer who led the first expedition to reach the South Pole. His expedition reached the pole on December 14, 1911. Designed by architect Paul Gerhardt, Roald Amundsen School opened on November 10, 1930, two years after the explorer died in a rescue mission to the North Pole. Amundsen was not a high school when it opened, but a junior high. The Amundsen building also played host to branches of other schools, including a branch of McPherson Elementary that opened in Amundsen in 1932.

On July 26, 1933, Amundsen Junior High became Amundsen Senior High. In addition to serving high school pupils it also accommodated an elementary school unit. In June 1935 the Amundsen Elementary unit closed except for a small number of first and second-graders kept on as a branch of Goudy Elementary. This branch of Goudy in Amundsen became a branch of Hamilton on January 8, 1936, and remained until 1937 when it was rendered obsolete by the newly erected Chappell School. In 1956, the school was the first site of a two-year college program that later grew to become present-day Harry S Truman College. Above the main entrance is inscribed the quote, "A brave man may fall but cannot yield."

Athletics
Amundsen competes in the Chicago Public League (CPL) and is a member of the Illinois High School Association (IHSA). The schools sport teams are nicknamed Vikings. The boys' soccer team were public league champions five times (1984–1985, 1987–1988, 1998–1999, 1999–2000, 2001–2002), Class AA three times (1998–1999, 1999–2000, 2001–2002) and regional champions four times (2008–2009, 2011–2012, 2013–2014, 2016–2017). The girls' soccer team were public league champions once in 1997–1998 and regional champions two times (2008–2009, 2010–2011).

Jorndt Field
The sports stadium was renovated in 2004 and renamed Jorndt Field after Louis C. Jorndt, who taught and coached at Amundsen from 1930 until 1953. His son Dan and his wife Pat donated $1 million for the renovation. Football scenes for the movie The Express: The Ernie Davis Story (2008), about the life of Ernie Davis, the first African-American to win the Heisman Trophy, were filmed in Jorndt Field in April and May 2007.

Notable alumni
 Bob Fosse, nine–time Tony Award-winning theatrical director and choreographer; won an Academy Award for directing the film Cabaret
Don Koehler, one of 17 known people in medical history to reach a height of 8 feet (2.44 m) or more
Michael Mann, film writer, director, and producer (Heat, Ali, The Aviator, The Insider, Public Enemies)
 Haris Mujezinović, former Bosnia & Herzegovina national team player and Euroleague basketball player
Wally Osterkorn, former professional basketball player; played for the 1948-49 Illinois Fighting Illini men's basketball team that reached the NCAA tournament's Final Four
Don Rehfeldt, two-time Big Ten scoring champion for Wisconsin; professional basketball player
Roy Thinnes, television and film actor (The Invaders, The Long, Hot Summer, Falcon Crest)
Tony Yalda, film actor (American Dreamz, Meet the Spartans); lead singer of The Hollabacks

References

External links

 Amundsen High School

Educational institutions established in 1929
Public high schools in Chicago
1929 establishments in Illinois
International Baccalaureate schools in Illinois